The following television stations broadcast on digital channel 40 in the United States:

 K40AE-D in Cashmere, etc., Washington, to move to channel 15
 K40IJ-D in Topeka, Kansas, to move to channel 22
 K40KC-D in Tulsa, Oklahoma, to move to channel 27
 K40MT-D in Bonners Ferry, Idaho, to move to channel 31

The following stations, which are no longer licensed, formerly broadcast on digital channel 40:
 K40DD-D in Gruver, Texas
 K40GZ-D in Preston, Idaho
 K40HE-D in Redding, California
 K40IK-D in Wallowa, Oregon
 K40JV-D in Stateline, etc., California
 K40KQ-D in Wyola, Montana
 K40LJ-D in Lincoln, Nebraska
 W40AN-D in Escanaba, Michigan
 WODF-LD in Rockford, Illinois
 WYDJ-LD in Myrtle Beach, South Carolina

References

40 digital